Watercolor Fairies is an educational art book published 2003 a compilation of the 21st century contemporary visual art movement of fairies and fantasy featuring the art of the foremost artists of this new movement.

Books about visual art